Le miroir de Cassandre (lit. The Mirror of Cassandra) is a book written by Bernard Werber.

The themes of the book are: future-seeing, freedom, exclusion, the future of humanity and autism. The name of the protagonist is a reference to the Cassandra from Homer's Iliad, who receives a gift from the god Apollo: the ability to see into the future.

Presentation of the book 
The following is a translation of the presentation of the book available on the author's French website: 

What would you do
			If you could see the future
			And nobody believed?

Plot summary 

"Il sera une fois" (There will be)
Cassandra Katzenberg has the ability to see into the future, but cannot remember anything before the bomb attack in Egypt which killed both her parents. After running away from the school of the Hirondelles, she finds refuge in "Redemption", a village improvised by 4 refugees in a dump yard.

"Il est une fois" (There is)

"Il était une fois" (There has been)

References

External links
Bernard Werber's official website.

2009 French novels
Novels by Bernard Werber